This article displays the qualifying draw of the 2011 Italian Open (tennis).

Players

Seeds

Qualifiers

Lucky losers

Qualifying draw

First qualifier

Second qualifier

Third qualifier

Fourth qualifier

Fifth qualifier

Sixth qualifier

Seventh qualifier

References
 Qualifying Draw

Italian Open – Singles Qualifying
Men's Singles Qualifying
Qualification for tennis tournaments